GMR Group is an Indian multinational conglomerate headquartered in New Delhi. The group was founded in 1978 by Grandhi Mallikarjuna Rao (G M Rao) and comprises several companies including GMR Infrastructure, GMR Energy, GMR Airports, GMR Enterprises. Employing the public-private partnership model, the Group has implemented several infrastructure projects in India. The Group also has a global presence with infrastructure operating assets and projects in several countries including Nepal, Indonesia, Singapore, Philippines and Greece.

GMR Group owns, develops, operates and manages airports, major energy utilities, highways and urban infrastructure facilities. With a net asset base of nearly US $6 billion, GMR Group is one of the largest infrastructure development companies in India.

Background
GMR Group chairman Grandhi Mallikarjuna Rao, a first-generation entrepreneur hailing from Rajam in Srikakulam District in Andhra Pradesh, pledged $340 million, which is equivalent to his personal share in the infrastructure conglomerate, to improve education among the under-served sections of the society.

The company started with Agri-based industries like Jute, Sugar, Breweries and slowly moved in the Infrastructure space over the past decade. Now the GMR group interests lie in areas of Airports, Energy, Highways and Urban Infrastructure.

GMR Infrastructure Limited is the infrastructure holding company formed to fund the capital requirements of various infrastructure projects across the sectors. It undertakes the development of the infrastructure projects through its various subsidiaries.

Business

Airports

GMR Group entered the airports development space in 2003.

GMR Group’s airport portfolio comprises India's busiest Delhi International Airport and Hyderabad International Airport in India and Mactan Cebu International Airport in The Philippines. The portfolio has further expanded by bagging the rights for developing the new Greenfield Airport in Goa, India in 2016 and New Heraklion International Airport in Greece in 2017. Besides this, the Group has recently been awarded the concession for the development, operations and management of Bhogapuram Airport in Andhra Pradesh. In the year 2020, the group has signed the concession agreement to commission, operationalize and maintain the Civilian Enclave at the Bidar Airport in Karnataka. GMR Group is developing airport cities on the commercial lands available around its airports in Delhi, Hyderabad and Goa. 

In July 2020, Groupe ADP acquired a 49% stake in GMR Airports.

GMR has announced it will develop and transform Nagpur Airport into a world-class aviation hub in multiple phases. It will focus on replicating its successful upgrade efforts in Delhi Airport in India and Cebu-Mactan in Philippines. The plan includes the expansion of terminal handling capacity, development of a second runway and a new Air Traffic Control Tower (ATC) to boost capacity to levels that could potentially serve the needs for the next 2-3 decades of growth.
GMR Hyderabad International Airport wins the ‘Golden Peacock Business Excellence Award 2017’

GMR Aerocity Hyderabad
In April 2021, GMR Group announced the launch of GMR Hyderabad Airport City, which is proposed to be the largest aerotropolis in India spread across  around Rajiv Gandhi International Airport, and is being billed as an "integrated ecosystem covering Office Space, Retail, Leisure, Entertainment, Hospitality, Education, Healthcare, Aerospace & Logistics".  In September 2021, GMR Group said that it will invest  519.52 crore towards metro connectivity at the airport. During foundation laying ceremony of Hyderabad Airport Metro Express on 9 December 2022, GMR Group contributed  , or 10 per cent of the project's cost.

GMR Services Business 

GMR Services Business vertical offers specialized services in the field of airport development and operations, which includes aviation consultation, engineering and maintenance, operations management, security solutions, and staff training.

GMR Aviation Academy 
GMR Aviation Academy (GMRAA) was established at the Rajiv Gandhi International Airport,Shamshabad, Hyderabad in 2009. 

GMR started its Aviation Academy in Kochi, Kerala on 23 January 2023 at ASAP Community Skill Park, KINFRA, Kalamassery, Kochi.

GMR Aviation 
GMR Aviation was formed in 2006 to offer aircraft charter services and consultancy for business aviation. Apart from owning and managing its own fleet, GMR Aviation also manages aircraft of other business groups.

RAXA Techno Security Solutions 
RAXA Techno Security Solutions, provides security solutions and is one of the first security organizations in the country to be certified with ISO 18788:2015.The academy provides techno security solutions and services like cyber security, automation & system integration, events management, executive protection, drone based service, etc.

GMR Engineering and Management Services (GEMS)

GMR Engineering and Management Services (GEMS), is a provider of engineering and management services and has been in operation for the last 15 years.

Energy

GMR Group is a player in the Indian power sector with an installed capacity of 3200 MW. The group has 15 power generation projects across Hydro, Thermal and Renewable energy of which 11 are operational and 4 are under various stages of development.

Urban Infrastructure 
In the Urban structure business, the GMR group is currently developing an 850- hectare large format ‘Special Investment Regions’ (SIR) at Krishnagiri, near Hosur in Tamil Nadu.
The SIR is designed and developed by GMR as self-contained eco-systems for economic activity.

Transportation 
GMR’s Transportation business has surface transport projects including roads, railways, metros and airstrips/runways in both DBFOT (under GMR Highways) and EPC (under GIL – EPC) segments. In roads and highways, GMR is a leading developer with 6 operating assets adding to the total length of over 2,400 lane km. In railways, GMR has a total order book of 4,000 Crores with projects from reputed clients like Dedicated Freight Corridor Corporation of India (DFCCIL) and Rail Vikas Nigam Limited (RVNL).

Sports 
GMR has forayed into sports by promoting the Indian Premier League (IPL) cricket team – Delhi Capitals and Pro Kabaddi League - UP Yodha.  

Delhi Capitals

The Delhi Capitals was established in 2008 as Delhi Daredevils (DD). The franchise is jointly owned by the GMR Group and JSW Group. In 2023, the also jointly bought a team in the Women's Premier League based in Delhi.

UP Yoddha

UP Yoddha (UPY) is a Kabaddi team based in Lucknow, Uttar Pradesh that plays in the Pro Kabaddi League.

1Sports

GMR Varalakshmi Foundation 
GMR Varalakshmi Foundation (GMRVF), the Corporate Social Responsibility wing of the Group, develops innovative and locale-specific initiatives in the areas of Education; Health, Hygiene & Sanitation; Empowerment & Livelihoods; and Community development programmes.

GMR Engineering College 

GMR Engeenering college is one of the reputed colleges in GMR’s hailing district of Srikakulam, Andhra Pradesh providing quality technical education since more that 25 years.

References

Conglomerate companies of India
Companies based in Delhi
Indian companies established in 1978
1978 establishments in Delhi
Conglomerate companies established in 1978
Indian Premier League franchise owners
GMR Group